Estudiantes (in English: students) is the name of different sports clubs in the Spanish-speaking world:

Argentina
 Estudiantes de La Plata, sports club based in La Plata, Buenos Aires Province
 Estudiantes de Buenos Aires, football club based in Caseros, Buenos Aires Province
 Estudiantes de Río Cuarto, football club based in Río Cuarto, Córdoba Province
 Estudiantes de Paraná, multi-sports club based in Paraná, Entre Ríos Province
 Estudiantes de Bahía Blanca, basketball club based in Bahía Blanca, Buenos Aires Province
 Estudiantes de Olavarría, basketball club based in Olavarría, Buenos Aires Province

Other countries
 CB Estudiantes, Spanish basketball club
 Estudiantes de Mérida, Venezuelan sports club
 Estudiantes de Medicina, Peruvian football club
 Estudiantes de Altamira, Mexican football club
 Estudiantes Tecos, Mexican football club, formerly known as Tecos UAG
 Estudiantes Tecos Reserves, the club's reserves team
 Estudiantes F.C., Salvadoran football club
 SV Estudiantes, Aruban football club

Other uses
 El estudiante, 2009 Mexican film
 El estudiante (2011 film), 2011 Argentine film
 El estudiante de Salamanca, work by José de Espronceda